Prasophyllum fuscum, commonly known as the slaty leek orchid or tawny leek orchid, is a species of orchid endemic to a small region of New South Wales. It has a single tubular green leaf and up to thirty greenish brown to reddish brown flowers. There is debate about the taxonomy of the species with some authorities considering Prasophyllum uroglossum as a separate species. Only about twenty five plants are known to survive in south-western Sydney.

Description
The edges of the labellum are slightly crinkled and there is a shiny, raised callus in its centre. Flowering occurs between September and December.

Taxonomy and naming
Prasophyllum fuscum was first formally described in 1810 by Robert Brown from a specimen collected in "moist meadows towards George's River". The description was published in Prodromus Florae Novae Hollandiae et Insulae Van Diemen. The specific epithet (fuscum) is a Latin word meaning "brown". The name has been applied to other species widely distributed throughout south-eastern Australia, including P. pallens, but the species is presently understood to be restricted to an area south-west of Sydney.

Distribution and habitat
The slaty leek orchid is only known from a single population growing on a roadside in the Wilton district. It grows in moist, sandy soil amongst grasses and sedges.

Conservation
Prasophyllum fuscum is listed as "Vulnerable" under the Commonwealth Government Environment Protection and Biodiversity Conservation Act 1999 (EPBC) Act and as "Critically Endangered" under the New South Wales  Threatened Species Conservation Act 1995. The main threats to the population are habitat loss, changes to water quality and weed invasion.

References

External links 
 
 

fuscum
Flora of New South Wales
Endemic orchids of Australia
Plants described in 1810